Kotdwar is a city, municipal corporation in Pauri Garhwal district of Uttarakhand, India. It's just 101 km from Pauri town , the district headquarter. It is the eighth-largest city in Uttarakhand. Its old name was "Khohdwar", which means the gateway of the river Khoh since it is located on the bank of river Khoh. It is situated in the southwestern part of the state and is one of the main entrance points in the state of Uttarakhand.

Initially isolated and less known, it came into prominence when it was connected with rails in 1890 by the Britishers.

Sidhbali Temple is dedicated to Lord Hanuman and is visited by millions of believers all around the year.

Etymology
Kotdwar means Gateway to Garhwal because it's a gateway to hills of Pauri Garhwal region in Uttarakhand.

History 
The city was initially ruled by the Mauryan Empire under the Great Ashoka, followed by the rule of Katyuri dynasty and then Panwar dynasty of Garhwal.

British rule 
Gurkhas reigned Kotdwar for almost 12 years, after which the British defeated them and took control over the region. The Kotdwar Railway Station established by the Britishers is one of the oldest in India. Being a Gateway to Garhwal it was used for transporting timber from Garhwal. The first passenger train ran in 1901.

Geography
Kotdwar is at foothills of Himalayas. By road Kotdwar is  North of Delhi,
 South of Dehradun,  West of Nainital,  East of Roorkee.

Climate
The climate of Kotdwar is generally sub-tropical, although it varies from tropical; from hot in summers to severely cold in winter, depending upon the season and the altitude of the specific location. The nearby hilly regions often get snowfall during winter but the temperature in Kotdwar is not known to fall below freezing. The highest temperature of Pauri district has been recorded at Kotdwar at  During the monsoon season, there is often heavy and protracted rainfall. Kotdwar and other plains areas of Uttarakhand see almost as much rainfall as Coastal Maharashtra. The weather is considered to be good during winter in the hilly regions. Agriculture benefits from fertile alluvial soil, adequate drainage, and plentiful rain.

The warmest month (with the highest average high temperature) is May . The month with the lowest average high temperature is January . The coldest month (with the highest average low temperature) is January .

The wettest month (with the highest rainfall) is July – . The driest month (with the lowest rainfall) is November – .

The month with the longest days is June (Average daylight: 14h). The month with shortest days is December (Average daylight: 10.3h).

Demographics

Religion 
Hinduism is the dominant religion in Kotdwar. Other religions with a significant presence include Islam, Christianity, Jainism, Sikh.

As of 2011–2020 India census, Kotdwar had a population of 1,75,232. Males constitute 53% of the population and females 47%. Kotdwar has an average literacy rate of 79.63% – higher than the national average of 64.83% – Male literacy is 88%, and female literacy is 75.5%. In Kotdwar, 14% of the population is under 6 years of age.

Education
As of the 2011 Census of India, Kotdwar had 26 primary schools, 8 middle schools, 8 secondary schools and 5 senior secondary schools as well as 1 arts college, 1 science college, 1 commerce college and 1 polytechnic college.

Healthcare
Healthcare in the Kotdwar is provided by private and public facilities.

Government hospitals 

 Government hospital
 Kotdwara ECHS Polyclinic

Private hospitals 

 Kotdwar Child Care and Maternity Centre
 Bisht Ortho Hospital
 Devbhoomi Eye Hospital
 Devrani Clinic
 Kala ENT and Skin
 Mansa Maternity And Surgical Centre
 Kotdwar Eye Hospital & Laser Centre
 Maithani Medical Centre
 Maa Kamakhya Multi Speciality Hospital′

Industry
Kotdwar has two major industrial areas, SIDCUL and BEL. Among the industries, the most prominent ones are Simpex Pharma, Reliance Medi Pharma, Polestar polymers, Sidhbali steels, Del Monte, Indica Chemicals, etc.

Military cantonment
The Garhwal Rifles has its base in Lansdowne, approximately 37 km from Kotdwar. Kotdwar also has a cantonment area called VC Gabar Singh Camp and a combined ECHS polyclinic & CSD complex.

Transportation

Air
Jolly Grant Airport is the nearest Airport to Kotdwar situated at a distance of 105 km. Taxis and bus are available from Jolly Grant Airport to Kotdwar.

Rail
Kotdwar is well connected by railways with major cities of India. One of the oldest Railway Station of India is situated at Kotdwar.

Road
Kotdwar is well connected with roads to major destination of Uttarakhand state. Buses to Kotdwar from Delhi are easily available. 
Kotdwar is well connected with National Highway 119.

Tourism

Jim Corbett National Park

Jim Corbett National Park is one of the oldest national parks in India, covering 1,318 km2. Bengal Tigers, leopards, deer, elephants, and bears can be easily seen in the park. On 27 November 2017, Chief Minister Trivendra Singh Rawat inaugurated the Jim Corbett National Park entry from Kotdwar. Ecotourism and operation of safari vehicles attract many tourists to Kotdwar and other Garhwal regions.

Lansdowne

Lansdowne (town) is one of the quietest hill stations of India and is popular since the British came to India. Lansdowne is unlike other hill stations as it is well connected with motorable roads but remote in its own way. It is situated at an altitude of 1,700 m above sea level surrounded with thick oak and blue pine forests in the Pauri Garhwal district of Uttarakhand state.
Lansdowne got its name from Lord Lansdowne, who was the then Viceroy of India during the period of 1888 – 1894. Presently, Lansdowne has the command office of the Garhwal Rifles division of the Indian Army.

Kanvashram
Kanvashram is an important place both historically, culturally and archaeologically in the history of India. It is located on the bank of river Malini about 14 km from Kotdwar. It is believed that Indra, the king of Gods, was scared by Sage Vishwamitra's meditation, sent a beautiful heavenly damsel named Menaka to the earth to disrupt his meditation. She succeeded in disturbing Vishwamitra's meditation. With their union, she gave birth to a girl child. Menka having succeeded in her purpose left the child on the bank of river Malini and went back to her heavenly abode. This child was found by sage Kanva and brought up in his ashram called Kanvashram. She was named Shakuntala by the sage. She later married the King of this region named Dushyanta. She gave birth to a boy child who was called Bharata, the prince after whom India was named as Bharatavarsha. About 10,000 pupils used to get an education in the ashram of Kanva Rishi in ancient time and since then the valley or ghati is known as Kanvaghati. [self-published source?]

Sidhbali Temple
At a distance of 3.4 km from Kotdwar's main market i.e. from Bus stand and Railway Station, the Siddhabali temple is dedicated to Lord Hanuman. The temple is located on the bank river Khoh, almost 50 meters above from the river bank. A large number of devotees visit the place round the year, including Hindus and people from other communities.

Durga Devi Temple
Situated at a distance of 10 km from the main town, the Durga Devi temple is one of the most important places of worship of the town. Durga Devi temple attracts numerous visitors traveling to Lansdowne. Durga Devi temple is situated 11 km ahead Kotdwar and 4 km before Duggada.

Durga Devi Temple is located in Near Kotdwar. Durga Devi Temple is located at 11 km from Kotdwar bus stand, on the road to Dugadda. One more famous temple located in Kotdwar is Sidhhabali Temple.

Koteshwar Mahadev
Situated at an elevation of 1428 m, this temple has a great following among childless couples. The temple houses a Shivling and is surrounded by the Himalayan ranges in the east, Haridwar in the west and Siddha Pith Medanpuri Devi temple in the south. Legends have it that a village woman inadvertently hit a Shivling while digging, divine voices were then heard, directing the people to construct a temple dedicated to Lord Shiva. Accordingly, the Koteshwar Mahadev temple was erected. It is believed that childless couples who chant the Mahamrityunjaya mantra (verse) during the whole month of Shravana with full faith and devotion are blessed by the Lord and their wishes are granted. It is also believed that during the Navratras the Goddess roves around, sitting upon her steed, the lion. Kotdwar is also known as the entrance towards Himalayas of Uttarakhand.

Medanpuri Devi
Situated at an elevation of 1657 m, the temple is popularly known as the Medanpuri Devi temple. 'Medan' literally means "curd," and it is believed that the Goddess showers Her devotees with milk, curd, and whey by way of blessings. Legend has it that the Goddess had appeared in a curd-bowl in the hearth of a family living in village Marora. The Goddess revealed to the head of the family the place where she would appear and a temple dedicated to the Goddess was then erected in her honor. Special offerings are made during the Navratras, followed by a big fair on Ashtami. Jeeps and taxis are available at Rishikesh (37 km), Chandighat and Haridwar (42 km). Accommodation is available in Tourist Rest Houses at Chila (36 km).

Tarkeshwar Temple
This is an ancient temple dedicated to Lord Shiva surrounded by thick Cedar trees. It is surrounded by deodar trees. The way to Tarkeshwar Temple was diverted from Chaukhuliyakhal to Bironkhal highway.

St. Joseph's Church

It is opened every day for people from all communities.

Shoonya Shikhar Ashram
This is a spiritual center near Kotdwara. One can reach it by 7 km of trekking from village Balli, which is itself around 30 km uphill from Kotdwara. Shoonya Shikar Ashram is known for the meditation cave of Sadguru Sadafaldeo Ji Maharaj. This is the place where Swarved was written. It attracts people from all over the world, in particular the followers of Vihangam Yoga, who seek high-level meditation.

Charekh Danda
Charkanya Shikhar, locally known as ‘Charekh Danda’, was once the heavenly abode of the great sage, Maharishi Charak. It was here that Maharishi Charak compiled the granth or book called ‘Nighut’ which possessed valuable information about the medicinal plants that were indigenous to the Himalaya. This is 20 km from Kotdwara. There are views of Kotdwara city and Himalaya from this site.

See also
 Kotdwar District

References

External links 
 
 Kotdwar

Cities and towns in Pauri Garhwal district